The Motor City Rockers are a professional minor league ice hockey team based in Fraser, Michigan. The team is the tenth to join the Federal Prospects Hockey League (FPHL). After experiencing delays due to the COVID-19 pandemic, the Rockers played their first game on October 13, 2022.

History
On July 16, 2020, a new FPHL team led by team president Adam Stio was approved to play at Fraser Hockeyland for the 2020–21 season. On August 11, 2020, the Motor City Rockers were announced by Stio. At this event, Stio also introduced the team's first head coach, Kahlil Thomas. Thomas never coached a game for the Rockers. 

The team's first transactions were acquiring Ryan Alves and Tim Santopaolo from the Columbus River Dragons via a trade. The Rockers were originally scheduled to play in 2020, but the COVID-19 pandemic delayed their launch. 

In September 2022, the Rockers named Gordie Brown as their head coach. On October 13, 2022, the Rockers played their inaugural game at the 3,400 seat Big Boy Arena with a new general manager, Nick Field.

References

External links
 Motor City Rockers

Federal Prospects Hockey League teams
Ice hockey clubs established in 2020
2020 establishments in Michigan
Ice hockey teams in Michigan
Sports teams in Michigan